Harold "Hal" Brown (1917 – January 2002) was a Canadian athlete who competed in the 1938 British Empire Games.

At the 1938 Empire Games he won the gold medal in the long jump event. He also finished fourth in the javelin throw competition and fifth in the triple jump contest.

References

External links
commonwealthgames.com results

1917 births
2002 deaths
Canadian male long jumpers
Canadian male triple jumpers
Canadian male javelin throwers
Athletes (track and field) at the 1938 British Empire Games
Commonwealth Games gold medallists for Canada
Commonwealth Games medallists in athletics
20th-century Canadian people
21st-century Canadian people
Medallists at the 1938 British Empire Games